Samuel Groth and John-Patrick Smith were the defending champions, but Groth and John-Patrick Smith chose not to compete.
Miķelis Lībietis and Hunter Reese won in the final 6–3, 6–4 against Gastao Elias Sean Thornley.

Seeds

Draw

Draw

References
Main Draw

Knoxville Challenger - Doubles
Knoxville Challenger